Claude Bouhier de Lantenay (19 October 1681 – 19 June 1755) was a French clergyman and the second bishop of Dijon after his uncle Jean Bouhier.

Family
He was the son of Bénigne Bouhier (1635–1703), président à mortier to the parlement de Dijon, and Louise Claire Claude de La Toison (1650–1750). His brother was the jurist Jean Bouhier.

1681 births
1755 deaths
Bishops of Dijon